Edward Arnold Publishers Ltd was a British publishing house with its head office in London.  The firm had published books for over 100 years. It was acquired by Hodder & Stoughton in 1987 and became part of the Hodder Education group in 2001. In 2006, Hodder Arnold sold its academic journals to SAGE Publications. In 2012, Hodder Education sold its medical and higher education lines, including Arnold, to Taylor & Francis. Edward Arnold published books and journals for students, academics and professionals.

Founder
Edward Augustus Arnold was born in Truro on 15 July 1857. His  grandfather was Thomas Arnold and his uncle Matthew Arnold. He was educated at Eton and Hertford College, Oxford.

From 1883 he worked as a magazine editor for the firm of Richard Bentley and from 1887 edited Murray's Magazine for the John Murray publishing house.

He set up his own publishing business in January 1890. Trading under his own name and later as Edward Arnold & Co., he specialized in educational books, exploration, mountaineering, Egyptology, and medical and scientific texts. He published most of E. M. Forster's major works.

He died at Budleigh Salterton on 6 November 1942.

Book series
 Arnold’s English Literature Series
 Kingfisher Library 
 Stratford-Upon-Avon Series
 Studies in Australian Literature
 Studies in English Literature   
 Studies in French Literature
 York Medieval Texts

Footnotes

Bibliography
 Bryan Bennett and Anthony Hamilton, Edward Arnold: 100 Years of Publishing, London: Edward Arnold [Hodder & Stoughton], 1990. . Illustrated with black and white plates and recounts the publishing company of Edward Arnold & Co. in the years 1890–1990.

External links
 
 
 Publisher Edward Arnold & Co. at National Archives - correspondence with the Royal Geographical Society between Sept. 1923 and Nov. 1926.

Publishing companies of the United Kingdom
Educational book publishing companies
Publishing companies established in 1890
1890 establishments in England